Kang Mee-sun or Kang Mi-sun (born ) is a retired South Korean female volleyball player. She was part of the South Korea women's national volleyball team.

She participated in the 1994 FIVB Volleyball Women's World Championship, and at the 1998 FIVB Volleyball Women's World Championship in Japan.
On the club level she played with Heungkuk Life.

Clubs
 Heungkuk Life (1994)

References

1971 births
Living people
South Korean women's volleyball players
Place of birth missing (living people)
Asian Games medalists in volleyball
Volleyball players at the 1998 Asian Games
Medalists at the 1998 Asian Games
Asian Games silver medalists for South Korea